The Eastern Flames FC is a Saudi women's football club based in Dammam, Saudi Arabia.

Domestically, Eastern Flames won the first SAFF Women's Regional League; East Region.

Eastern Flames plays its home games at the Prince Mohamed bin Fahd Stadium.

History
Women’s sports in Saudi Arabia were very limited when the Eastern Flames soccer team was first founded in 2006. Eastern Flames won the Eastern Region league two consecutive times in 2020 and 2021. But that didn’t stop Kaye Smith from following her passion in forming the Eastern Flames team.

In those 14 years, the team has evolved from a recreational activity inside Aramco’s community into a full-fledged team that competes in regional tournaments.

Today, women’s sport is encouraged by the Saudi government, as it falls under the Quality of Life Program which is one of the Kingdom’s Vision 2030 initiatives.

the Beginning
The Eastern Flames started with few members as Smith faced difficulties in finding players and coaches to join the team. Still, the team was able to host tournaments in Dhahran, playing other Saudi teams. In 2009, the Flames participated in their first Rotary Club of Manama’s Charity Tournament.

From the beginning, the players took practices very seriously, with the women — married and single — building their lives around weekly practicing sessions at the Hills Field inside Aramco’s Dhahran community.

Then, in 2010, the Eastern Flames felt the need to level up their performance, joining the Arsenal Soccer School Cup league in Bahrain with the goal to become competitive by playing against more experienced players. As it was their first league, they struggled through the whole season without winning a game. Still, they were strong believers in progress and took their time to reflect on their losses, returning stronger the following season.
The Eastern Flames has undergone management restructuring that has pumped new blood into the team and brought bigger goals. In 2014, Maram Al Butairi, a financial analyst at Aramco, became the manager, pumping new blood into the team with bigger goals. In a couple of months, she appointed Chapa as co-manager.

Working Harder, Getting Better
Looking to expand the number of players and the team’s capabilities, leaders recruited more players from the company through word of mouth, The Arabian Sun, and advertisements in the community to build a richer talent pool.

The Eastern Flames, though, faced recruitment challenges regarding the public nature of participation. Because of this, the club tries to raise awareness among the local communities to support the current direction of the Kingdom, increasing women’s participation in sports.

Last year, the team participated in its biggest tournament — and the first women’s football tournament — at the Gulf Cooperation Council in Al Ain, UAE. Supported by the Saudi Arabian Football Federation in an effort to expose the Eastern Flames to professional players to leverage their skills, it marked a major milestone for the team by allowing them to play against other teams such as the UAE National Team, Al Ain Football Club, and the Super Soccer Team from Bahrain.

Saudi Women's Regional, National and Premier League
as the Eastern Flames emerged as winners of the regional SAFF Women's regional League, they clinched their first-ever ticket to the Women's SAFF National league as the Eastern Representative.
On 15 September 2022, Eastern Flames were announced among the teams that will contest Saudi first ever women's premier league. marking history for the club.
the club has since then signed contracts with several North African players. and Colombian Striker Sara Toro.

Players

Current squad 
.

Honours

Domestic 
SAFF Women's Regional League (Eastern region) (2, record):  (2020–21, 2021–22)

International

See also 
 Saudi Women's Premier League

External links 
 
 
 Website

References 

Football clubs in Eastern Province, Saudi Arabia
Women's association football clubs
Association football clubs established in 2006